The Song of the Scarlet Flower is a 1938 Finnish romance and drama film. It is based on the novel The Song of the Blood-Red Flower by Johannes Linnankoski, telling the story of a glib log driver Olavi Koskela, who spends his free time flirting with young maids. Film is directed by Teuvo Tulio and it stars Kaarlo Oksanen, Rakel Linnanheimo (sister of Regina Linnanheimo), Mirjami Kuosmanen, Nora Mäkinen, Birgit Nuotio and Maire Ranius. The film was the first Finnish adaptation of the book, with the two previous adaptations being Swedish.

Tulio said he was interested mainly in the book's intense and sensuals love scenes but also in the rafting sessions, which he then used in three later films as well. The film's rafting scenes were shot at the Mankalankoski rapids in Iitti.

The film was premiered in Finland on December 4, 1938. Tulio got his work distributed in Sweden, where the first performance was on October 16, 1939 in Stockholm. In Finland, the audience success of the film was the best of the domestic premieres of 1938, although the film received a rather mixed reception from critics. By the time the 1980s came, the tone of the film's reviews had turned more positive.

Plot
Olavi Koskela (Kaarlo Oksanen), a young and handsome man, wanders as a lumberjack in the countryside, as women and landscapes change frequently. However, Kyllikki (Rakel Linnanheimo), the daughter of the rich Moisio house, does not easily fall for Olavi's charms. Bold Olavi has to descend a life-threatening rapid to win Kyllikki's favor. As if by a miracle, the young man completes the log rafting, and Kyllikki's reluctance begins to melt. Love goes up in flames when Olavi and Kyllikki have to swim across the stream, but the Moisio's host and Kyllikki's father (Veikko Linna), gets furious when he hears about the young couple's intentions to get married. However, Olavi is not quite an ordinary log man: he is the son from the mighty Koskela house, who has left home after arguing with his parents; Olavi angered them by intending to marry the maid Annikki (Mirjami Kuosmanen).

Olavi doesn't try to persuade Moisio's master to be kinder by revealing his true, "fine" parentage, but goes on to continue his journey. Along the way, he meets women he has slept with before. In the end, a man with a lot of experience returns to the homestead, where the mother (Ida Kallio) is lying on her deathbed and forgives her son for the past quarrels. Olavi's father (Lauri Korpela) had died before the reconciliation. Olavi returns to the of Moisio's house and takes Kyllikki as his wife, ignoring the host's objections. By the time of the wedding, Olavi's true identity as the heir to the rich Koskela house has been revealed, and Moisio's host is also very pleased with his daughter's marriage.

However, Olavi and Kyllikki's marriage runs into a crisis already on the wedding day. Olavi wants Kyllikki as a virgin and gets angry when it is revealed by Toivo (Onni Veijonen) that Kyllikki once had a boyfriend before Olavi. Kyllikki, on the other hand, reminds Olavi of his adventures with women. The union, which started with a wild frenzy, gradually calms down after the birth of the couple's first child. Finally, sins have received their atonement.

Cast
 Kaarlo Oksanen as Olavi Koskela
 Rakel Linnanheimo as Kyllikki Moisio
 Mirjami Kuosmanen as Annikki
 Nora Mäkinen as Elli/"Gaselli"
 Birgit Nuotio as dark girl
 Maire Ranius as "Pihlajanterttu"
 Sylvi Palo as prostitute
 Aku Peltonen as logging chief
 Veikko Linna as Kyllikki's father
 Lauri Korpela as Olavi's father
 Ida Kallio as Olavi's mother
 Onni Veijonen as Toivo
 Elli Ylimaa as midwife

References

External links

1938 films
1938 romantic drama films
Finnish romantic drama films
1930s Finnish-language films
Films based on Finnish novels
Films about lumberjacks